The 2017 United States Olympic Curling Trials were held from November 11–18, 2017 at Baxter Arena in Omaha, Nebraska. Five teams qualified for the men's tournament and three teams qualified for the women's tournament. The winner of each tournament represented the United States at the 2018 Winter Olympics in Pyeongchang County, South Korea.

Road to the Trials
USA Curling used a number of selection criteria to determine which teams would qualify for the Olympic Trials. If an American team placed in the top five at the 2017 World Men's Curling Championship or 2017 World Women's Curling Championship, that team would automatically qualify for the Olympic Trials. The John Shuster and Nina Roth rinks qualified via this method. Next, teams had an opportunity to qualify for the Olympic Trials by placing in the top 15 of the World Curling Tour Order of Merit standings for the 2016–17 season. No US teams placed high enough in these standings to automatically qualify in this manner. The final criterion used for inclusion in the trial was a discretionary selection by USA Curling's Olympic Team Selection Committee. The committee was required to choose some number of teams for each tournament to ensure that there were a minimum of three and a maximum of five teams competing. The committee chose three men's teams and two women's teams. A fifth team, skipped by Todd Birr, was added to the men's tournament after a successful appeal to the USCA Judiciary Hearing Panel, alleging that the Olympic Team Selection Committee erred in its decision not to include Team Birr in the tournament.

Men

Teams
Five teams qualified for the men's tournament:

Round-robin standings
Final round-robin standings

Round-robin results
All draw times are listed in Central Standard Time (UTC−6).

Draw 1
Saturday, November 11, 1:00 pm

Draw 2
Saturday, November 11, 7:00 pm

Draw 3
Sunday, November 12, 1:00 pm

Draw 4
Sunday, November 12, 7:00 pm

Draw 5
Monday, November 13, 11:00 am

Draw 6
Monday, November 13, 7:00 pm

Draw 7
Tuesday, November 14, 11:00 am

Draw 8
Tuesday, November 14, 7:00 pm

Draw 9
Wednesday, November 15, 11:00 am

Draw 10
Wednesday, November 15, 7:00 pm

Tiebreaker
Thursday, November 16, 8:30 am

Final
The final round was between the top two teams at the end of the round robin. The teams played a best-of-three series.

Game 1
Thursday, November 16, 6:00pm

Game 2
Friday, November 17, 6:30pm

Game 3
Saturday, November 18, 6:30pm

Women

Teams
Three teams qualified for the women's tournament:

Round-robin standings
Final round-robin standings

Round-robin results
All draw times are listed in Central Standard Time (UTC−6).

Draw 1
Saturday, November 11, 7:00 pm

Draw 2
Sunday, November 12, 1:00 pm

Draw 3
Sunday, November 12, 7:00 pm

Draw 4
Monday, November 13, 11:00 am

Draw 5
Monday, November 13, 7:00 pm

Draw 6
Tuesday, November 14, 11:00 am

Draw 7
Tuesday, November 14, 7:00 pm

Draw 8
Wednesday, November 15, 11:00 am

Draw 9
Wednesday, November 15, 7:00 pm

Final
The final round was between the top two teams at the end of the round robin. The teams played a best-of-three series.

Game 1
Thursday, November 16, 1:30 pm

Game 2
Friday, November 17, 1:00pm

Game 3
Saturday, November 18, 10:00am

References

External links
Website at USA Curling

United States Olympic Curling Trials
United States Olympic Curling Trials
Olympic Curling Trials
United States Olympic Curling Trials
Curling in Nebraska
Sports competitions in Omaha, Nebraska
UOlympic Curling Trials
United States Olympic Curling Trials
Curling at the 2018 Winter Olympics